Tenderness is a live album by Al Jarreau, released in 1994 by Reprise Records. Although officially a live album, it was recorded in studio in front of an invited audience. The album is a compilation of some of Jarreau's older recordings like "We Got By" and "You Don't See Me", covers of artists such as Elton John and Carole King and the Beatles, and more recent pieces from Jarreau's catalogue.

Critical reception

AllMusic wrote that Jarreau "turned himself loose on the songs with a freedom that hasn't been heard extensively on his records since the '70s."

Track listing

Personnel 
 Al Jarreau – lead vocals (1-12), vocal percussion (1, 6, 9, 11, 12), backing vocals (5, 7), vocal arrangements 
 Joe Sample – acoustic piano (1, 3-6, 10-12), Fender Rhodes (2, 7-9)
 Philippe Saisse – synthesizers (1-12)
 Neil Larsen – Hammond organ (2, 5), Fender Rhodes (5)
 Jason Miles – additional synthesizer (4), synthesizer programming (11)
 Eric Gale – acoustic guitar (1, 7, 10), electric guitar (2, 3, 5, 6, 8, 9, 11, 12)
 Paul Jackson, Jr. – additional guitar (1)
 Marcus Miller – bass guitar (1-12), arrangements 
 Steve Gadd – drums (1-12)
 Paulinho da Costa – percussion (1-3, 5-12)
 Bashiri Johnson – percussion (4)
 Don Alias – percussion (11)
 Michael Brecker – tenor saxophone (4)
 David Sanborn – alto saxophone (6, 7)
 Kenny Garrett – alto saxophone (8)
 Michael "Patches" Stewart – trumpet (1, 2, 5, 6, 8, 9)
 Jeffrey Ramsey – backing vocals (1, 3, 5, 7, 9), BGV arrangements (9)
 Sharon Young – backing vocals (1, 3, 5, 7, 9), lead vocals (5)
 Kathleen Battle – lead vocals (4)
 Stacy Campbell – backing vocals (5)

Production 
 Producer – Marcus Miller
 Production Coordinator – Robby Scharf
 Production Supervisor – Bibi Green
 Engineers – Guy Charbonneau (Tracks 1-3, 5-10 & 12); Bruce Miller (Track 4); James Farber (Track 11).
 Additional Engineers – Jeff DeMoris, Charles Essers, Joe Feria, Tim Jaquette, Tom Mahn, Marcus Miller, Brian Scheuble and Christian Wicht.
 Assistant Engineers – Charlie Bouis, Bino Espinoza, John Hendrickson, Aaron Kropf, Tanya McGinnis, Luis Quine, Andy Smith, Brian Vibberts, Michael White, Dann Wojnar and Bruno Young.
 Mixed by Bill Schnee at Schnee Studios, Andora Studios and Ocean Way Recording (Hollywood, California).
 Mastered by Doug Sax at The Mastering Lab (Hollywood, California).
 Art Direction and Design – Greg Ross
 Photography – Henry Diltz, Gene Kirkland and Michael Wilson.
 Management – Patrick Rains & Associates

References 

1994 albums
Al Jarreau albums
Albums produced by Marcus Miller
Reprise Records albums